Frank Kesson (27 August 1885 – 29 September 1939) was an American cinematographer. He worked with Byron Haskin in The Sea Beast (1926), the Spanish western film El hombre malo (1930), El cantante de Nápoles (1935) with William Rees, La dama atrevida (1931), La llamada sagrada (1931), Die heilige Flamme (1931), and Millionaires (1926).

He also worked in How I Play Golf - Trouble Shots (1931), Beware of Bachelors (1928) with Norbert Brodin, Beware of Married Men (1928), Bobbed Hair (1925), Rinty of the Desert (1928), Why Girls Go Back Home (1926), Women They Talk About (1928), While London Sleeps (1926).

He died on 29 September 1939.

Filmography

References

Bibliography

External links
 

1885 births
1939 deaths
American cinematographers
Burials at Los Angeles National Cemetery